Don Dow Gililland (commonly misspelled as Gilliland; born 31 January 1939 Dallas, Texas) is a jazz guitarist and composer who recorded three rockabilly hits in 1956 on Sun Records with "Wade & Dick — The College Kids," led by Wade Lee Moore (born 1934) and Dick Penner: "Wild Woman", "Don't Need Your Lovin"', and "Bop Bop Baby".

Gililland got a part as a guitarist in the movie Rock Baby Rock It!, which was being filmed in Dallas in 1956. During the next year, he enrolled at North Texas State University, where he performed with the school's One O'Clock Lab Band. After graduating he worked in clubs with Buster Smith. During the day, he was employed by the Oak Cliff Tribune. He became managing editor, then worked for the Dallas Area Rapid Transit.

"Bop Bop Baby" was included on the soundtrack of Walk the Line, the film biography of Johnny Cash.

Discography

As sideman
 One O'Clock Lab Band, North Texas Lab Band (90th Floor, 1961) ; re-released under the title The Road to Stan (90th Floor, 2009) as a tribute to musicians associated with the Stan Kenton Orchestra
 Don Jacoby, Swinging Big Sound: Don Jacoby and The College All Stars (Decca, 1961)
 Wade & Dick – The College Kids, "Bop Bop Baby" b/w "Don't Need Your Lovin' Baby" (Sun, 1957); "Bop Bop Baby" (alternate version) b/w/ "Don't Need Your Lovin' Baby" (1956)
 Dick Penner, "Cindy Lou" (Sun, 1957)
 Sag, Drag and Fall (1955), score composed by Ken Massey and Don Gililland

Filmography 
 Rock Baby Rock It! (1957)
 This World Won't Break (2019)

References

1939 births
Living people
People from Dallas
American jazz guitarists
American rockabilly guitarists
American male guitarists
Songwriters from Texas
Guitarists from Texas
20th-century American guitarists
Country musicians from Texas
Jazz musicians from Texas
20th-century American male musicians
American male jazz musicians
American male songwriters